Dinesh Chaudhary is an Indian politician and a member of 17th Legislative Assembly, Uttar Pradesh of India. He represents the Kerakat (Vidhan Sabha constituency) of Uttar Pradesh. He contested Uttar Pradesh Assembly Election as Bharatiya Janata Party candidate and defeated his close rival Sajai Kumar Saroj from Samajwadi Party with a margin of 15,259 votes.

Posts held

See also
Uttar Pradesh Legislative Assembly

References

Uttar Pradesh MLAs 2017–2022
Bharatiya Janata Party politicians from Uttar Pradesh
People from Jaunpur district
1960 births
Living people